Patricia ‘Pat’ Raftery is a former camogie player, captain of the All Ireland Camogie Championship winning team in 1950. She won a previous All Ireland senior medal in 1949.

Career
With Coláiste San Dominic she featured on the 10946 team which won a surprise Dublin senior championship.

References

External links
 Camogie.ie Official Camogie Association Website
 Wikipedia List of Camogie players

Dublin camogie players
Year of birth missing
Possibly living people